Besh Qardash (or Besh Ghardash) (Persian: بش قارداش) is a monument and mineral spring in Bojnord, North Khorasan Province, Iran. The place is an entertainment and historical tourism attraction and labeled as a national heritage by the Iran Cultural Heritage, Handcrafts and Tourism Organization.

Place
Besh Qardash is located along the Bojnord-Esfarayen road, roughly 7 kilometers from Bojnord. The place is close to the villages of Mehnan, and Asadli.

History
The term "Besh Qardash" means "Five Brothers" in the Khorasani Turkic language which is a local language in the region. It refers to the mythic history of the place. According to the myth, there had been five brothers fighting against the then-brutal government and when they harbored to a hillside, they disappeared and five water springs trilled.

In the Qajar era, Naser al-Din Shah passed the place in his state visit and ordered Yar Mohammad Khan Shadlou (also known as Sardar Mufakham or Siham al-Dowleh Bojnordi) to construct a monument right next to the springs. Also a crown shaped swimming pool was built after some time.

Gallery

References

External links
 More Photos in Tishineh

Mausoleums in Iran
Architecture in Iran
Buildings and structures in North Khorasan Province
Monuments and memorials in Iran
Tourist attractions in North Khorasan Province